The following is a list of county-maintained roads in McLeod County, Minnesota, United States. Some of the routes included in this list are also county-state-aid-highways (CSAH.)

Route list

External links
McLeod County Map
Biscay Map
Brownton Map
Glencoe Map
Hutchinson Map
Lester Prairie Map
Plato Map
Silver Lake Map
Stewart Map
Winsted Map
McLeod County

McLeod
McLeod